Ramakant Maheshwar Muzumdar was an IOFS officer. He was the second Indian Director General of the Indian Ordnance Factories. He studied engineering at the University of Cambridge. 

Muzumdar was awarded the Padma Bhushan in the Civil service category, by the Government of India, in 1973, for his contributions during the Indo-Pakistani War of 1971.

References 

Indian Ordnance Factories Service officers
Indian civil servants
Indian government officials
Indian engineers
Recipients of the Padma Bhushan in civil service